Paul Bragiel (born 15 September 1977 in Chicago, Illinois) is an internet entrepreneur and currently a managing partner of Bragiel Brothers.

Early life
Bragiel, the oldest child of Mary and Walter Bragiel, was raised in Mt. Prospect and South Barrington, Illinois. In the late 1990s, he was involved in the demoscene.

Ventures
Bragiel graduated from University of Illinois in 1999.  Shortly after graduating he founded his first company, Paragon 5, with offices in Chicago and Poland. In 2004, he founded the first location-based social network, Meetro. In 2008, he founded Lefora, which was sold to Crowdgather in the summer of 2010.

In 2010, he launched i/o Ventures, a seed fund and accelerator based in San Francisco.

In 2012, he launched three more technology-focused seed funds. Savannah Fund (Sub-Saharan Africa) and Golden Gate Ventures (Southeast Asia) were created to foster entrepreneurship in those regions. Gamefounders (Eastern Europe) invests in companies building gaming-related products.

In 2014, Paul launched Sisu Game Ventures, a $50m global early-stage venture fund investing in games.

In 2015, he launched Presence Capital, a $10m venture fund investing in early-stage virtual reality (VR) and augmented reality (AR) companies.

In 2019, he launched SMOK Ventures, a $50m venture fund investing in early-stage companies in Central & Eastern Europe.

In 2021, Paul launched Niu Ventures, a $10m venture fund investing in early-stage companies in Brazil.

He travels around the world to give lectures on startups and is an advisor to governments on their technology and entrepreneurship policy including Philippines, Singapore, Brazil and Tanzania.

Olympics
In 2013, Bragiel trained in cross-country skiing in Finland with a view to competing in the 2014 Sochi Olympics under the Colombian flag. In order to participate, Bragiel obtained Colombian citizenship by presidential decree and was soon globally addressed as the man who was hacking his way into the Olympics.

For the 2016 Summer Olympics, Bragiel joined the Tonga delegation as team attaché.

During the 2018 Winter Olympics, Bragiel served as a coach for both the Colombia and Tonga cross-country ski teams.  He is noted as being the first person to participate in the Opening and Closing Ceremonies for two different countries in the same Olympics.

References

External links 
Wall Street Journal article about Bragiel's venture fund i/o Ventures.
TechCrunch interview with Bragiel and Ashwin Navin, founding partners of i/o Ventures
Forbes article on Savannah Fund
Pando Daily article on Golden Gate Ventures launch
Wall Street Journal article about Bragiel's Olympic quest
Bragiel's official fan page

21st-century American businesspeople
University of Illinois Urbana-Champaign alumni
Living people
1977 births
American people of Polish descent
Demosceners
People from Mount Prospect, Illinois
People from South Barrington, Illinois